Dead Man Talking is a 2012 Belgian comedy-drama film directed by Patrick Ridremont. It was written by Ridremont and Jean-Sébastien Lopez. It premiered on September 29, 2012, at the Festival International du Film Francophone de Namur. The film was nominated for eight Magritte Awards, winning Best Production Design for Alina Santos. It has also been nominated for the Best Foreign Film award at the 39th César Awards.

Cast
 François Berléand as Karl Raven
 Virginie Efira as Élisabeth Lacroix
 Patrick Ridremont as William Lamers
 Christian Marin as Georges
 Jean-Luc Couchard as Stieg Brodeck
 Olivier Leborgne as Robert Gayland
 Denis Mpunga as Julius Lopez
 Pauline Burlet as Mme Raven
 Leila Schaus as Florence
 Joffrey Verbruggen as Ruy Blas

References

External links

2012 films
2012 comedy-drama films
Belgian comedy-drama films
French comedy-drama films
2010s French-language films
French-language Belgian films
2010s French films